Bob Annesley (10 July 1919 – 3 February 2003) was an Australian rules footballer who played with Essendon in the Victorian Football League (VFL) during World War II. He spent most of his playing career with Swan Districts in the West Australian Football League (WAFL). Annesley was later captain-coach of local side, Scarborough, where he won six consecutive premierships in the 1960s.

Notes

External links 
		

Essendon Football Club past player profile
WAFL statistics

1919 births
2003 deaths
Australian rules footballers from Western Australia
Essendon Football Club players
Swan Districts Football Club players